Child development is the biological, psychological and emotional change that occurs in human beings between birth and the end of adolescence.

Child development may also refer to:

 Child Development (journal)

See also 
 Developmental psychology